The Dukhovskaya Church, formally the Church of the Descent of the Holy Spirit , is a former Russian Orthodox church in Saint Petersburg.

Built into the existing wing of the monastery that linked the Holy Trinity Cathedral and the Annunciation Church, the new church was designed to ease overcrowding of the Annunciation Church. As built, the church was richly decorated with a three-tiered iconostasis and paintings and sculpture from some of Russia's leading artists. The church was consecrated in 1822 in the name of the Descent of the Holy Spirit, and shortly afterwards a small aisle at the choir end of the church was consecrated in the name of Saint Sergius of Radonezh. Renovations took place in 1867, and extensions were made to increase burial space. In 1881 the Dukhovskoy Church hosted the funeral of author Fyodor Dostoevsky, and in the mid-1890s a small chapel was consecrated to Saint Evdokia.

Despite calls to protect the important historical and artistic heritage of the church, it was not one of those selected for conversion into a museum necropolis during the Soviet period and was instead passed through various organisations, who at times used it as a boiler room, for coal storage, or as temporary accommodation. The church was briefly returned to the diocese in the 1950s, and a church was once more consecrated, this time to Saint Alexander Nevsky. It was once again confiscated by the city authorities during a period of anti-religious campaigning and hosted a blood transfusion station until its return to the monastery in the early 2000s. The church building is undergoing restoration, and there are plans to reopen it as a place of worship.

Design and construction
The Dukhovsky wing of the monastery, linking the Holy Trinity Cathedral and the Annunciation Church, was designed by Domenico Trezzini in the Petrine Baroque style. The ground floor held meeting rooms and monastic cells, the upper storey contained halls, the rooms of the governor, and more cells. Plans for a new church to ease the overcrowding in the Annunciation Church had been under consideration since 1817, and in 1819 the halls adjacent to the Annunciation Church were combined into a single two-storey hall, with altar in its eastern part.

On 23 May 1820 construction started on a house church for the wing, by order of Metropolitan , and to the design of architect Vasiliy Petrov. The Lavra's own funds were not sufficient to cover the cost, so donations were solicited. The building was expanded from the east side to accommodate the altar, and a porch was placed on the west side. The new church was consecrated on 18 May 1822 by Metropolitan  in the name of the Descent of the Holy Spirit. The church had a floor-to-ceiling three-tiered iconostasis by J. B. Nashon and K. Scheibe, with paintings by D. I. Antonelli. The altarpiece, titled "Transformation" was painted by A. V. Shevelykin, while further decoration was provided with a series of evangelical images by M. K. Nabokov and stucco works by N. Zorin. On the left of the choir was an icon with a particle of the relics of Saint Panteleimon.

Renovations
The church was renovated in 1867 and decorated with paintings by R. F. Vinogradov. On 1 February 1881 the Dukhovskoy Church was the setting of the funeral of author Fyodor Dostoevsky. Between 1894 and 1895 a small chapel with a single-tier iconostasis was built to the right of the altar, over the crypt of the Galunov family, and consecrated on 12 March 1895 by Metropolitan Palladiy to Saint Evdokia.

Soviet period
The Dukhovskaya Church was the last of the Lavra churches in operation during the Soviet period, finally being closed in mid-January 1936. A commission, consisting of representatives from the Institute of History, the Communist Academy, Pushkin House, the Academy of Material Culture, the Committee for the Preservation of Monuments, the Museum of the City, and others, proposed that the Dukhovskaya Church be protected in the same way as the Annunciation Church, "because of the presence of a large number of museum valuables and historical burials". The proposal was ignored, and in July 1936 the city administration turned the Dukhovskaya Church over to the "Lengorplodovoch" organisation, which demolished many of the funerary monuments to install a boiler room and coal storage. The icons were transferred to the Holy Trinity Cathedral, and after numerous public protests, after six months the church was transferred to the OSOAVIAKhIM Aero Club, and then to the Spartak sports society. The church then ended up being transferred to the Kirov Plant for use as temporary accommodation.

The Dukhovsky wing was returned to the diocese in 1949, and in 1950 a church was briefly consecrated in the building to Saint Alexander Nevsky, but was closed in 1961 during the resumption of the anti-religious campaigns, and the church reverted to the city authorities. Up to the early 2000s the building hosted a blood transfusion station. The wing was finally restored to the monastery in 2001. The building currently houses the governor’s chambers and a number of monastic cells. In 2003 the monastery opened a spiritual-educational centre named "Svyatoduhovsky" in the former church. The monastery plans to rebuild the former Dukhovskaya Church as a home church.

Burials
Burials took place in the church even before its consecration, including that of its founder, Metropolitan Mikhail in 1820. Several crypts were constructed under the Dukhovskaya Church, and in 1825 another forty burial places were added at a cost of 1,000 rubles. The crypts of the Dukhovskaya Church offered much more burial space than that of the neighbouring Annunciation Church, over the century of its existence there came to be 172 graves, including those of several metropolitans of Saint Petersburg. A number of monuments were saved after the church's closure by being transferred to other museum sites in the Lava. Some, like those of Konstantin Bulgakov, Viktor Kochubey and Natalia Zagryazhskaya were transferred to the Lazarevskoe Cemetery church. Others, like those of Mikhail Miloradovich and Dmitry Senyavin, were placed in the Annunciation Church.

References

External links
Dukhovskaya Church at the Alexander Nevsky Lavra

Churches completed in 1822
Vasily Stasov buildings and structures
Russian Orthodox churches in Saint Petersburg
Tourist attractions in Saint Petersburg
Churches in the Alexander Nevsky Lavra

18th-century churches in Russia
Cultural heritage monuments of federal significance in Saint Petersburg